Jabez is an unincorporated community located in Russell County, Kentucky, United States.

A post office was established in the community during 1881, the building still remains. The town was named after the biblical city of Jabesh-Gilead.

References

Unincorporated communities in Russell County, Kentucky
Unincorporated communities in Kentucky